Mohammad Nasser Shakroun (born March 12, 1984, in Basra, Iraq) is a retired Iraqi football striker who last played for Naft Al-Janoob in Iraqi Premier League and the Iraq national football team.

Club career

International goals
Scores and results list Iraq's goal tally first.

Honours

Country 
2007 Asian Cup winners

External links 

1984 births
Living people
Iraqi expatriate footballers
Iraqi footballers
Iraq international footballers
People from Basra
Sportspeople from Basra
Expatriate footballers in Qatar
Al-Mina'a SC players
Bargh Shiraz players
Shahin Bushehr F.C. players
Expatriate footballers in Iran
Al-Khor SC players
Expatriate footballers in Cyprus
Apollon Limassol FC players
Cypriot First Division players
Qatar Stars League players
Persian Gulf Pro League players
2007 AFC Asian Cup players
AFC Asian Cup-winning players
Association football forwards